Sitti Djalia Turabin Hataman (born 26 November 1977) is a Filipina politician serving as the mayor of Isabela, Basilan since 2019. She previously served as the Party-list Representative of Anak Mindanao and was the executive director of the National Commission on Muslim Filipinos.

Background
Sitti is the wife of politician Mujiv Hataman.

Political Activities
Sitti served as director (or Secretary General) of the Moro Human Rights Center, as of at least 2002, and President of Pinay Kilos (PINK), since at least 2007.  She has focused advocacy on the plight of families in conflict areas of Sulu and Basilan in Mindanao. In 2017 she, herself, left congress.

References

1977 births
Living people
Filipino civil servants
Benigno Aquino III administration personnel
Filipino human rights activists
Filipino Muslims
Nonviolence advocates
Mayors of places in Basilan
21st-century Filipino women politicians
21st-century Filipino politicians
Party-list members of the House of Representatives of the Philippines